Mirroring is the behavior in which one person subconsciously imitates the gesture, speech pattern, or attitude of another. Mirroring often occurs in social situations, particularly in the company of close friends or family, often going unnoticed by both parties.The concept often affects other individuals' notions about the individual that is exhibiting mirroring behaviors, which can lead to the individual building rapport with others.

Mirroring is distinct from conscious imitation under the premise that while the latter is a conscious, typically overt effort to copy another person, mirroring is unconsciously done during the act and often goes unnoticed. It has also been described as the chameleon effect.

The display of mirroring often begins as early as infancy, as babies begin to mimic individuals around them and establish connections with particular body movements. The ability to mimic another person's actions allows the infant to establish a sense of empathy and thus begin to understand another person's emotions. The infant continues to establish connections with other individual's emotions and subsequently mirror their movements.

Mirroring can establish rapport with the individual who is being mirrored, as the similarities in nonverbal gestures allow the individual to feel more connected with the person exhibiting the mirrored behavior. As the two individuals in the situation display similar nonverbal gestures, they may believe that they share similar attitudes and ideas as well. Mirror neurons react to and cause these movements, allowing the individuals to feel a greater sense of engagement and belonging within the situation.

Occurrence

Mirroring generally takes place unconsciously as individuals react with the situation. Mirroring is common in conversation, as the listeners will typically smile or frown along with the speaker, as well as imitate body posture or attitude about the topic. Individuals may be more willing to empathize with and accept people whom they believe hold similar interests and beliefs, and thus mirroring the person with whom one is speaking may establish connections between the individuals involved.

Interviews

Additionally, mirroring may play a role in how well an individual fares in a job interview. Within a study conducted by Word, Zanna and Cooper, interviewers were instructed to follow specific types of body language in different experimental conditions. In one condition, interviewers were instructed to demonstrate distant and uninterested body language (such as leaning away or avoiding eye contact), and in another condition, they were asked to demonstrate more welcoming body language (such as smiling and making eye contact). As a result, the individuals being interviewed began to mirror the actions of the interviewer, and thus the individuals in the condition with less friendly body language fared worse within the interview than did individuals in the friendly condition. The study demonstrates that the initial attitudes that an interviewer may have of the individual being interviewed may affect the performance of the interviewee due to mirroring.

Effects of lacking

Individuals with autism or other social difficulties may be less likely to exhibit mirroring, as they may be less unconsciously and consciously aware of the actions of others. This factor may cause additional difficulties for the individuals, as without mirroring, establishing connections with other people may be more difficult. Additionally, other individuals may be less likely to build rapport with the person, as without mirroring the person may seem more dissimilar and less friendly. Individuals who are not unconsciously aware of the gesture may have difficulties in social situations, as they may be less able to understand another person's perspective without it being explicitly stated, and thus may not understand covert cues that are often used in the social world. It is possible for autistic individuals to deliberately learn and become aware of these cues.

Examinations in humans
The use of noninvasive fMRI studies have shown that there is evidence of mirroring in humans similar to that found in monkeys in the inferior parietal lobe and part of the inferior frontal gyrus. Humans show additional signs of mirroring in parts of the brain not observed to show mirroring properties in primates, such as the cerebellum. Mirroring has also been shown to allow neurotypical children to understand what the intentions of an action are before seeing the entire sequence. Because of this, a child can see someone pick up food with the intention to eat and fire all necessary motor chains needed for them to pick up their own food and go through the motions of eating it as well. It has been shown that children with autism lack this motor chain reaction and are thought to use other senses, such as visual or somatosensory, to accomplish similar tasks.

Development

In infant-parent interactions, mirroring consists of the parent imitating the infant's expressions while vocalizing the emotion implied by the expression. This imitation helps the infant to associate the emotion with their expression, as well as feel validated in their own emotions as the parent shows approval through imitation. Studies have demonstrated that mirroring is an important part of child and infant development. According to Kohut's theories of self-psychology, individuals need a sense of validation and belonging in order to establish their concepts of self. When parents mirror their infants, the action may help the child develop a greater sense of self-awareness and self-control, as they can see their emotions within their parent's faces. Additionally, infants may learn and experience new emotions, facial expressions, and gestures by mirroring expressions that their parents utilize. The process of mirroring may help infants establish connections of expressions to emotions and thus promote social communication later in life. Infants also learn to feel secure and valid in their own emotions through mirroring, as the parent's imitation of their emotions may help the child recognize their own thoughts and feelings more readily.

Self-concept

Mirroring has been shown to play a critical role in the development of an infant's notion of self. The importance of mirroring suggests that infants primarily gather their social skills from their parents, and thus a household that lacks mirroring may inhibit the child's social development. Without mirroring, it may be difficult for the child to relate their emotions to socially learned expressions and thus have a difficult experience in expressing their own emotions.

Empathy

The inability to properly mirror other individuals may strain the child's social relationships later in life. This strain may exist because others may feel more distant from the child due to a lack of rapport, or because the child may have a difficult time feeling empathy for others without mirroring. Mirroring helps to facilitate empathy, as individuals more readily experience other people's emotions through mimicking posture and gestures. Mirroring also allows individuals to subjectively feel the pain of others when viewing injuries.  This empathy may help individuals create lasting relationships and thus excel in social situations. The action of mirroring allows individuals to believe they are more similar to another person, and perceived similarity can be the basis for creating a relationship. As such, mirroring values is also important.

Rapport

Rapport may be an important part of social life, as establishing rapport with an individual is generally the initial route to becoming friends or acquaintances with another person. Mirroring can help establish rapport, as exhibiting similar actions, attitudes, and speech patterns as another person may lead them to believe that one is more similar to them and thus more likely to be a friend. Individuals may believe that because one replicates the individual's gestures, that one may hold similar beliefs and attitudes as the individual. Mirroring may be more pervasive in close friendships or romantic relationships, as the individuals regard each other highly and thus wish to emulate or appease them. Additionally, individuals who are friends may have more similarities than two strangers, and thus may be more likely to exhibit similar body language regardless of mirroring.

The activation of mirror neurons takes place within the individual who begins to mirror another's movements and allows them a greater connection and understanding with the individual who they are mirroring, as well as allowing the individual who is being mirrored to feel a stronger connection with the other individual.

Power dynamics

Additionally, individuals are likely to mirror the person of higher status or power within the situation or when they feel physical attraction to the other person. Mirroring individuals of higher power may create an illusion of higher status, or create rapport with the individual in power, thus allowing the person to gain favor with the individual in power. This mechanism may be helpful for individuals in situations where they are in a position of bargaining with an individual who possesses more power, as the rapport that mirroring creates may help to persuade the higher status individual to help the person of lower status. These situations include job interviews, other work situations such as requesting promotions, parent-child interactions and asking professors for favors. Each of these situations involves one party who is in a less powerful position for bargaining and another party who has the ability to fulfill the person of lower status's needs but may not necessarily wish to. Thus, mirroring can be a useful tool for individuals of lower status in order to persuade the other party to provide goods or privileges for the lower status party.

See also
 Kinesthetic learning
 Nonverbal communication

References

Human communication
Interpersonal relationships